Robert Markaryan (born April 20, 1949 in Baku) is a Russian diplomat. He has served as ambassador of Russia to Syria, and to Croatia.

Biography
Markaryan was born on April 20, 1949 in Baku to an Armenian family. In 1978 he graduated at the Institute of Asian and African Countries of the Moscow State University. He gained a PhD in history.

In 1996 he became a diplomat. Between 1996 and 1998 he was director of the secretariat of the Russian Foreign Ministry. During the time he was member of the ministry as well. Between 1999 and 2006 he was Russian ambassador to Syria, after which he was named an ambassador for special matters of the Russian Foreign Ministry. In September 2009 he was appointed Russian ambassador to Croatia.

He speaks Arabic and English language.

He is married with one son.

References

External links
Biography (in Russian)

Living people
1948 births
1st class Active State Councillors of the Russian Federation
Ambassador Extraordinary and Plenipotentiary (Russian Federation)
Diplomats from Baku
Moscow State University alumni
20th-century Russian historians
Russian people of Armenian descent
United Russia politicians
21st-century Russian politicians
Ambassadors of Russia to Syria
Ambassadors of Russia to Croatia